Sheikh Abdullah Al-Salim Al-Sabah (1895 – 24 November 1965,) was the eleventh ruler of the Sheikhdom of Kuwait from 1950 to 1961 and the first Emir of the State of Kuwait after the country gained its independence from Great Britain on 19 June 1961.

Biography
Abdullah was the eldest son of Salim Al-Mubarak Al-Sabah. He was the minister of finance from 1939 to 1940. He took power after the death of his cousin Ahmad Al-Jaber Al-Sabah and also ruled as regent upon the death of his father until the election of Sheikh Ahmad. The anniversary of his coronation, 25 February, serves as Kuwait's national day.

Unlike his predecessors, Abdullah was more pro-Arab than pro-British. He effectively ended the British "protectorate" status of Kuwait by signing a treaty with the British on 19 June 1961. He is regarded as the founder of modern Kuwait. He introduced the Constitution of Kuwait in 1962, followed by the Parliament in 1963. He is regarded as having been more committed to constitutionalism and parliamentary democracy than successive rulers.

Death
Abdullah Al-Salim died on November 24th 1965 after suffering from a heart attack during the opening session of the National Assembly.

Honours and awards

National
  Sovereign Grand Master of the Order of National Defense
  Sovereign Grand Master of the Military Duty Order

References

1895 births
1965 deaths
Date of birth unknown
House of Al-Sabah
Rulers of Kuwait
Finance ministers of Kuwait
Honorary Knights Grand Cross of the Order of St Michael and St George
Knights of Grace of the Order of St John
Honorary Companions of the Order of the Indian Empire
20th-century Kuwaiti people